Bert Boyer is an American molecular biologist who is the Professor of Molecular Biology for the Department of Biology and Wildlife at University of Alaska Fairbanks, Bob and Charlee Moore Endowed Professor, Director of Alaska Native Health Research, and OHSU Knight for the Cardiovascular Institute School of Medicine. He was instrumental in forming the Center for Alaska Native Health Research. Boyer's research group specifically focuses on genetic and environmental risk and prevention initiatives related to obesity and diabetes in Yup'ik Eskimos from Southwest Alaska.

Education 
In 1982, Boyer received a Bachelor of Arts degree from Texas Tech University, Lubbock, Texas. He then attended LSU Health Sciences Center New Orleans in New Orleans, Louisiana, where he obtained his Ph.D. for Physiology in 1988.

Community-Based Participatory Research (CBPR)  
Boyer's Community-based participatory research (CBPR) with the Yup'ik Eskimos, emphasizes the importance of collaboration with Alaskan Native community as equal partners in all phases of the research process with the goal of eliminating health disparities. Boyer and his colleagues have conducted a fifteen-year longitudinal study in rural Alaska, which involves about 2,000 Yup’ik Alaska Natives based in eleven communities around Alaska. Their research evaluates how the Native peoples subsistence style diet and physical activity may prevent chronic diseases, such as diabetes.

Publications 
Grarup N, Moltke I, Andersen MK, Bjerregaard P, Larsen CVL, Dahl-Petersen IK, Jørsboe E, Tiwari HK, Hopkins SE, Wiener HW, Boyer BB, Linneberg A, Pedersen O, Jørgensen ME, Albrechtsen A, Hansen T. Identification of novel high-impact recessively inherited type 2 diabetes risk variants in Greenlandic Inuit. In press. Diabetologia.
Henderson L, Claw C, Woodahl E, Robinson R, Boyer B, Burke W, and Thummel K. P450 Pharmacogenetics in Indigenous North American Populations. 2018. 8, 9; doi:10.3390/jpm8010009. Journal of Personalized Medicine.
Koller KR, Flanagan CA, Day GE, Patten C, Umans JG, Austin MA, Hopkins SE, Raindl C and Boyer BB. High Tobacco Use Prevalence with Significant Regional and Sex Differences in Smokeless Tobacco Use among Western Alaska Native People: The WATCH Study. In Press. International Journal of Circumpolar Health.
Philip J, Ryman TK, Hopkins SE, O'Brien DM, Bersamin A, Pomeroy J, Thummel KE, Austin MA, Boyer BB, Dombrowski K. Bi-cultural dynamics for risk and protective factors for cardiometabolic health in an Alaska Native (Yup’ik) population. In press PLOS ONE.
Au NT, Ryman T, Rettie AE, Hopkins SE, Boyer BB, Black J, Philip J, Yracheta J, Fohner AE, Reyes M, Thornton TA, Austin MA, Thummel KE. Dietary Vitamin K and Association with Hepatic Vitamin K Status in a Yup’ik study population from Southwestern Alaska. In Press. Molecular Nutrition & Food Research 2018 Feb;62(3). doi: 10.1002/mnfr.201700746. Epub 2017 Dec 29.
Au NT, Reyes M, Black J, O’Brien D, Hopkins S, Boyer BB, Fohner A, Thornton T, Austin MA, Burke W, Yracheta J, Thummel KE, and Rettie AE.. Dietary and Genetic Influences on Hemostasis in a Yup’ik Alaska Native Population. PLOS ONE. 2017. 12(4):e0173616. Doi: 10.1371. ; PMCID PMC5380313.
Ryman TK, Boyer BB, Hopkins S, Philip J, Thompson B, Beresford SA, Thummel KE and Austin MA. Association between iq’mik smokeless tobacco use and cardiometabolic risk among Yup’ik Alaska Native People. 2017. Jan 24:1-15. doi: 10.1080/13557858.2017.1280136. [Epub ahead of print]. PMID 28116909 PMCID: PMC5796859 Ethnicity and Health.
Lemas DJ, Klimentidis YC, Aslibekyan S, Wiener HW, O'Brien DM, Hopkins SE, Stanhope KL, Havel PJ, Allison DB, Fernandez JR, Tiwari HK, Boyer BB. Polymorphisms in stearoyl CoA desaturase and sterol regulatory element binding protein interact with N-3 polyunsaturated fatty acid intake to modify associations with anthropometric variables and metabolic phenotypes in Yup'ik people. Mol Nutr Food Res. 2016 Jul 28. doi: 10.1002/mnfr.201600170. [Epub ahead of print] PubMed PMID 27467133.
Aslibekyan S, Vaughan LK, Wiener HW, Hidalgo BA, Lemas DJ, O'Brien DM, Hopkins SE, Stanhope KL, Havel PJ, Thummel KE, Boyer BB, Tiwari HK. Linkage and association analysis of circulating vitamin D and parathyroid hormone identifies novel loci in Alaska Native Yup'ik people. Genes Nutr. 2016 Aug 2;11:23. doi:10.1186/s12263-016-0538-y. eCollection 2016. PubMed PMID 27579147; PubMed Central PMCID: PMC4971612.
O'Brien DM, Thummel KE, Bulkow LR, Wang Z, Corbin B, Klejka J, Hopkins SE, Boyer BB, Hennessy TW, Singleton R. Declines in traditional marine food intake and vitamin D levels from the 1960s to present in young Alaska Native women. Public Health Nutr. 2016 Jul 28:1-8. [Epub ahead of print] PubMed PMID 27465921.Declines in traditional marine food intake and vitamin D levels from the 1960s to present in young Alaska Native women. (in press) Public Health Nutr.

References 

Living people
American molecular biologists
University of Alaska Anchorage faculty
Year of birth missing (living people)